Dada Thakur (Bengali: দাদাঠাকুর) (2001) is a Bengali drama film directed by Haranath Chakraborty. It is based on a Telugu film named Sneham Kosam (Hindi dubbed 'Main Hoon Rakhwala'), in which Ferdous Ahmed, Victor Banerjee & Arpita Pal played in lead roles.

Cast
 Ferdous Ahmed as Raja
 Arpita Pal as Mita, Younger Daughter of Dada Thakur
 Victor Banerjee as Rabindra Chowdhury aka Dada Thakur, Geeta & Mita's Father
 Ranjit Mallick as Sarathi, Raja's Father
 Tota Roy Chowdhury as Rathin Roy, Jyotin's younger brother
 Rajesh Sharma as Jyotin Roy, main antagonist & Geeta's husband
 Laboni Sarkar as Geeta, Elder Daughter of Dada Thakur
 Anamika Saha as Raja's grandmother 
 Subhasish Mukherjee as Bhola, Servant
 Shyamal Dutta as Nibaran Dutta, Dada Thakur's personal assistant

Soundtrack
Music was composed by Babul Bose. All songs were written by Gautam Sushmit. Udit Narayan, Kavita Krishnamurthy, Kumar Sanu, Babul Supriyo and Sadhana Sargam voiced the film.

References

External links
 

2001 films
Bengali-language Indian films
Films scored by Babul Bose
2000s Bengali-language films
Films directed by Haranath Chakraborty